Meri-Maari Mäkinen (born 26 February 1992) is a Finnish Paralympic swimmer who competes in the individual medley at international level events. She is a World champion and a European silver-medalist and has competed at the 2012 and 2016 Summer Paralympics.

References

1992 births
Living people
Sportspeople from Vantaa
Paralympic swimmers of Finland
Swimmers at the 2012 Summer Paralympics
Swimmers at the 2016 Summer Paralympics
Medalists at the World Para Swimming Championships
Medalists at the World Para Swimming European Championships
Finnish female medley swimmers
S7-classified Paralympic swimmers
20th-century Finnish women
21st-century Finnish women